Yorgelis Salazar (born 10 November 1997) is a Venezuelan karateka. She won the silver medal in the women's 50 kg event at the 2022 World Games held in Birmingham, United States.

In June 2021, she competed at the World Olympic Qualification Tournament held in Paris, France hoping to qualify for the 2020 Summer Olympics in Tokyo, Japan. She was eliminated in her second match by Jana Messerschmidt of Germany. In November 2021, she was eliminated in her first match in the women's 50 kg event at the World Karate Championships held in Dubai, United Arab Emirates.

She won the silver medal in the women's 50 kg event at the 2022 Bolivarian Games held in Valledupar, Colombia. She also won the silver medal in the women's team kumite event.

Achievements

References 

Living people
1997 births
Place of birth missing (living people)
Venezuelan female karateka
Competitors at the 2022 World Games
World Games silver medalists
World Games medalists in karate
South American Games medalists in karate
South American Games gold medalists for Venezuela
Competitors at the 2022 South American Games
21st-century Venezuelan women